Karen Glennon is an Irish professional wrestler and valet, best known by the ring name Martina or Session Moth Martina,

She is best known for her appearances in Over the Top Wrestling (OTT), Progress Wrestling, Stardom, Ring of Honor and Insane Championship Wrestling where she is a former ICW Women's Champion, 2 time OTT Women's Champion, OTT Gender Neutral Champion and Discovery Wrestling Women's Champion.

Professional wrestling career

Independent circuit (2017–2018)
Martina entered the Natural Progression Series IV Tournament where she made her debut for Progress Wrestling on 26 February 2017 but was defeated by Dahlia Black.

Martina made her Insane Championship Wrestling debut at ICW Fight Club - It's Always Raining In Glasgow on 21 January 2018, defeating Kasey and Ravie Davie. On 11 February 2019, at ICW 7th Annual Square Go!, Martina defeated Kasey Owens for the ICW Women's Championship. However, the next day, Martina lost the title versus Viper.

In 2018, Martina debut in World Wonder Ring Stardom where was integrated to the stable Oedo Tai.

Ring of Honor (2019–2022)
On 11 September 2019 it was reported that Martina had signed to Ring of Honor (ROH) after turning down a WWE contract following much-hyped tryouts. She made her official Ring of Honor debut at their Free Enterprise event on 9 February 2020, when she defeated Sumie Sakai. As ROH came to a close Martina was referred to as "The Most Charismatic Women's Wrestler Not In WWE Or AEW."

AEW Debut

In March 2022 it was revealed that Martina was making her first appearance with AEW on AEW Dark: Elevation in a match against Ruby Soho.

Championships and accomplishments
 Discovery Wrestling
 DW Women's Championship (1 time, current)
 Insane Championship Wrestling
 ICW Women's Championship (1 time)
 Over the Top Wrestling
 OTT Gender Neutral Championship (2 times)
 OTT Women's Championship (3 times, current)
 Pro Wrestling Allstars
 PWA Queen Of Diamonds Championship (1 time)
 Pro Wrestling Illustrated
 Ranked No. 82 of the top 100 female singles wrestlers in the PWI Women's 100 in 2020
 Ring of Honor
 ROH Year-End Award (1 time)
 Female Wrestler of the Year (2020)
 Southside Wrestling Entertainment
 SWE Tag Team Championship (1 time) – with Lana Austin

Personal life
Martina is the niece of veteran RTÉ News broadcaster Colm Murray through her mother Mary.

References

External links
 
 
 

Living people
Entertainers from Dublin (city)
Irish female professional wrestlers
1990 births
21st-century professional wrestlers